Hydra generally refers to:
 Lernaean Hydra, a many-headed serpent in Greek mythology
 Hydra (genus), a genus of simple freshwater animals belonging to the phylum Cnidaria

Hydra or The Hydra may also refer to:

Astronomy 
 Hydra (constellation)
 Hydra (moon), a satellite of Pluto

Computing 
 Hydra (chess), a chess computer
 Hydra (digital repository)
 Hydra (operating system)
 Hydra (software)
 Hydra 100, a multi-GPU hardware solution
 HYDRA Game Development Kit, a development system by André LaMothe
 Razer Hydra, a game controller
 NEC HYDRAstor, a storage system

Fictional entities 
 Hydra (comics), a fictional organization in the Marvel Universe
 Hydra (Marvel Cinematic Universe), an organisation in the Marvel Cinematic Universe based on the comics counterpart
 Hydra (Dungeons & Dragons), a fictional monster in D&D
 Hydra (Transformers), a character in Transformers
 The Hydra, a fictional organization in The Phantom
 Hydra, a character in UFO Ultramaiden Valkyrie
 The Hydra, a fictional deity created by Henry Kuttner
 Mother Hydra, the co-ruler of the Deep One race in the Cthulhu Mythos
 The Hydra, a fictional fighter jet in Grand Theft Auto: San Andreas and Grand Theft Auto Online
 The Hydra, a fictional machine in Kirby Air Ride

Film and television 
  Hydra (film), a 2008 monster movie
 Hydra (Chuck), a fictional database on Chuck
 Hydra, a fictional Dharma Initiative station on Lost

Music 
 Hydra Entertainment, the hip-hop record label
 Hydra (band), an American southern rock band in the 1970s
 Hydra (Otep album), 2013
 Hydra, a 2005 album by Satariel (band)
 Hydra (Toto album), 1979, or the title song
 Hydra (Within Temptation album), 2014
 Hydra (Iris album), a 2008 album by Iris
 "Hydra", a 2000 song by Dir En Grey from Macabre
 "Hydra", a song by Twilight Force from the 2019 album Dawn of the Dragonstar
 "HYDRA", a 2018 song by Myth & Roid

People 
 Hydra (skater), roller derby skater
 Hydra (wrestler), American professional wrestler

Places 
 Hydra, Algeria, a neighbourhood and a municipality in Algiers
 Hydra (island), an island of Greece

Ships 
 Hydra (ship), a hydrogen ship
 Greek ironclad Hydra, a French-built ironclad warship launched in 1889
 Greek destroyer Hydra, a Dardo-class destroyer launched in 1932
 Greek frigate Hydra, a MEKO 200-type frigate launched in 1992, lead ship of the Hydra class frigate
 HMS Hydra (1797), a 38-gun fifth rate
 HMS Hydra (1838), a wooden steam paddle sloop
 Hydra-class sloop, a class of British steam sloops
 HMS Hydra (1871), a Cyclops-class turret ship
 HMS Hydra (1912), an Acheron-class destroyer
 HMS Hydra J275), an Algerine-class minesweeper launched in 1942
 HMS Hydra (A144), an oceanographic survey vessel launched in 1965
 Hydra-class minelayer, a class of Dutch 1910s minelayers

Other uses 
 The Hydra, a literary magazine
 Hydra (association), a German self-help and advocacy group for prostitutes
 Hydra (video game), an arcade and Atari Lynx video game
 Hydra game, a concept in mathematical logic
 Hydra Market, a Russian language dark web marketplace that facilitated trafficking of illegal drugs as well as financial services
 Hydra the Revenge, a roller coaster at Dorney Park in Pennsylvania, US
 Hydra 70, an air-to-ground rocket
 Hydra Technologies, an unmanned aerial vehicle firm
 Hydra Trophy, a trophy of the roller derby WFTDA Championships
 Hydra, a wireless station during World War II at Camp X
 Operation Hydra (Yugoslavia)
 Operation Hydra (1943)

See also 

 Greek ship Hydra, a list of Hellenic Navy vessels
 HMS Hydra, a list of British Navy vessels
 Hydro (disambiguation)
 Hydrus, a small constellation in the deep southern sky
 Ghidra, reverse engineering software